Sŏhamhŭng station (West Hamhŭng station) is a railway station in Sŏngch'ŏngang-guyŏk, Hamhŭng city, South Hamgyŏng province, North Korea, on the Sŏho Line of the Korean State Railway. Locomotive and rolling stock maintenance facilities for the narrow gauge equipment used on the line are located here.

History 
The station was opened on 25 August 1923 by the Sinhŭng Railway, becoming the northern terminus of the Namhŭng Line between Sŏho station and here when the first section of that line, West Hamhŭng–Ch'ŏngiri, was opened on 11 May 1934. The Sinhŭng Railway was bought and absorbed by the Chosen Railway on 22 April 1938. Although originally the Hamhŭng–Hamnam Sinhŭng Hamnam Line ran through West Hamhŭng station, since the regauging of that line the new standard-gauge line bypasses this station.

References

Railway stations in North Korea